Florida Folk Festival is a long-running annual folk music festival in Hamilton County, Florida. It began in 1953. Thelma Boltin was an organizer for the festival.

The festival has also featured presentations in the Mikasuki language.

References

External links

MP3 files of the Florida Folk Festival, made available for public use by the State Archives of Florida
History of the Florida Folk Festival by the State Archives of Florida

Music festivals in Florida
Folk festivals in the United States
Tourist attractions in Hamilton County, Florida
1952 establishments in Florida
Music festivals established in 1952